John Sterne may refer to:
 John Sterne (bishop of Colchester) (died 1607), bishop of Colchester
 John Sterne (bishop of Dromore) (1660–1745), Irish churchman, bishop of Dromore, then bishop of Clogher

See also
 John Stearne (disambiguation)